The 1915–16 season would have been Manchester United's 24th season in the Football League and ninth in the First Division.

With the start of the First World War, all Football League football was cancelled. In its place were formed War Leagues, based on geographical lines rather than based on previous league placement. Manchester United contested the Lancashire Section in the Principal Tournament, and the Southern Division of the Lancashire Section in the Subsidiary Tournament. However, none of these were considered to be competitive football, and thus their records are not recognised by the Football League.

Lancashire Section Principal Tournament

Lancashire Section Subsidiary Tournament Southern Division

References

Manchester United F.C. seasons
Manchester United